James A. Cox, Jr. (born October 5, 1969) is an American politician. He was a Republican member of the Pennsylvania House of Representatives from the 129th District from 2007 until 2022.

Early life and education
Cox was born on October 5, 1969 in Chicago, Illinois. He graduated from Marquette Manor Baptist Academy in 1987. Cox earned a Bachelor of Arts degree in pre-law from Pensacola Christian College and a Juris Doctor degree from Regent University School of Law in 1992 and 1996, respectively. Following graduation from law school, Cox worked as Government Affairs Coordinator for the Rutherford Institute. From 1998 to 2006, he served as Chief of Staff for Pennsylvania State Representative Sam Rohrer.

Political career
Cox was first elected to represent the 129th District in the Pennsylvania House of Representatives in 2006. He was re-elected to seven more consecutive terms.

Cox served as chair of the House Labor and Industry Committee for the 2019-20 and the 2021-22 legislative sessions.

In 2020, Cox was among 26 Pennsylvania House Republicans who called for the reversal of Joe Biden's certification as the winner of Pennsylvania's electoral votes in the 2020 United States presidential election, citing false claims of election irregularities.

In 2022, Cox announced he would not seek re-election.

Personal life
Cox has five children with his wife, Kelly.

References

External links

1969 births
Living people
Politicians from Chicago
Republican Party members of the Pennsylvania House of Representatives
People from Berks County, Pennsylvania
Regent University School of Law alumni
21st-century American politicians